The Cold Spring Presbyterian Church is home to a congregation of worship and mission of the Presbyterian Church (U.S.A.) and West Jersey Presbytery that began in 1714.

Building 
The historic two-story red brick building located at 780 Seashore Road in the Cold Spring section of Lower Township, in Cape May County, New Jersey. The current church building, known as "Old Brick", was constructed in 1823  by Thomas H. Hughes, who was also the architect of Congress Hall in Cape May, New Jersey. This red brick building replaced a frame and shingle church erected in 1764, which itself replaced a 1714 log meetinghouse. The church's cemetery, Cold Spring Presbyterian Cemetery, is the site of a 1742 grave (that of Sarah Eldridge Spicer) and of the most Mayflower descendants anywhere outside Massachusetts. The church was added to the National Register of Historic Places on June 14, 1991 for its significance in settlement, architecture, religion, and government.

History
The congregation was founded in 1714, following the settlement of the area by Connecticut Presbyterians. The first regular pastor was the Rev. John Bradner, who served from 1715 until 1721, when he moved to Goshen in Orange County, New York. The Rev. Hughston Hughes served as pastor for one year, starting in 1726, before being dismissed for "his too free use of intoxicating drinks."

The Rev. Samuel Finley served as pastor for several years.  Finley, who was a graduate of the Log College, later became president of the College of New Jersey, the predecessor of Princeton University. Another Log College graduate, the Rev. Daniel Lawrence, served as pastor from 1752 until his death in 1766.  His tombstone in the adjacent graveyard was inscribed

The two hundredth anniversary of the church was celebrated on August 16, 1914. John Wanamaker, who attended when a child, contributed generously to the endowment fund. President Woodrow Wilson sent a congratulatory letter.

2016 community 
The congregation

...continues to believe that everyone deserves to experience God's love in relevant and authentic way
...The thriving faith community began a community-focused transformational initiative in 2016. Cold Spring Presbyterian Church delivers spiritual resources and experiences that are centered in God’s love and proclaim the abundant life through Jesus Christ to make greater Cape May a better place through worship, activities, events, and other ministries.

Notable burials

T. Millet Hand (1902–1956), represented New Jersey's 2nd congressional district in the United States House of Representatives from 1945–1957.
J. Thompson Baker (1847–1919), represented New Jersey's 2nd congressional district in the United States House of Representatives from 1913–1915.
Thomas H. Hughes (1769–1839), represented New Jersey's at-large congressional district in the United States House of Representatives from 1829–1833.
Charles W. Sandman Jr. (1921–1985), represented New Jersey's 2nd congressional district in the United States House of Representatives from 1913–1915.
Lieutenant Richard Wickes (died June 29, 1776) American Revolutionary War, mortally wounded at the Battle of Turtle Gut Inlet.

See also
 National Register of Historic Places listings in Cape May County, New Jersey

References

External links

 
 
 "Cape May Landmarks: Cold Spring Church" - Cape May Times Article
Cold Spring Presbyterian Cemetery at The Political Graveyard

Lower Township, New Jersey
Churches completed in 1823
19th-century Presbyterian church buildings in the United States
Churches on the National Register of Historic Places in New Jersey
Presbyterian churches in New Jersey
Cemeteries in Cape May County, New Jersey
Protestant Reformed cemeteries
U.S. Route 9
Churches in Cape May County, New Jersey
National Register of Historic Places in Cape May County, New Jersey
New Jersey Register of Historic Places
1714 establishments in New Jersey
Cold Spring
Historic American Buildings Survey in New Jersey